North Channel may refer to:

North Channel (Great Britain and Ireland)
North Channel (Ontario), body of water along the north shore of Lake Huron, Canada
North Channel, Hong Kong
Canal du Nord, France